Anthony Almein Brown Jr. (born July 27, 1998) is an American football quarterback for the Baltimore Ravens of the National Football League (NFL). He played college football at Boston College and Oregon.

Early life and high school
Brown grew up in the Cliffwood section of Aberdeen Township, New Jersey and attended St. John Vianney High School in Holmdel Township, New Jersey. He became the team's starting quarterback going into his junior year and passed for 2,198 yards and 25 touchdowns while rushing for 839 yards and eight touchdowns. As a senior, he passed for 2,298 yards and 33 touchdowns while rushing for 604 yards and nine touchdowns and was named first-team All-State and the Shore Conference Football Player of the Year.

College career

Boston College 
Brown redshirted his true freshman season at Boston College. The next year, Brown became the second freshman in school history to start a season opener and completed 134 of 258 passes for 1,367 yards and 11 touchdowns with nine interceptions before he suffered a season-ending knee injury. He started all 12 of the Eagles' games and completed 158 of 285 pass attempt for 2,121 yards with 20 touchdowns and nine interceptions in his redshirt sophomore season. As a redshirt junior, Brown completed 81-of-137 passes for 1,250 yards with nine touchdowns and two interceptions before suffering a season-ending knee injury six games into the season. After the firing of head coach Steve Addazio at the end of the season, Brown announced that he would be leaving Boston College with the intention of playing elsewhere as a graduate transfer. He committed to transfer to Oregon over Georgia, Mississippi State, Colorado, Michigan State, Vanderbilt, South Florida, and Northern Illinois.

Oregon 
Brown began his first season at Oregon as the backup to starter Tyler Shough. He made his first appearance for the Ducks in the 2020 Pac-12 Football Championship Game, where he played mostly in goal line situations and completed three of four pass attempts for 17 yards and two touchdowns as Oregon won 31-24 over the USC Trojans. Brown replaced Shough in the second quarter of the 2021 Fiesta Bowl against Iowa State and finished the game with 12-for-19 for 147 yards and two rushing touchdowns in a 34-17 loss. After the season, Brown opted to utilize the extra year of eligibility granted to college athletes who played in the 2020 season due to the coronavirus pandemic.

Brown was named the Ducks' starting quarterback going into the 2021 season after Shough had transferred to Texas Tech following the 2020 season. He started all 14 of Oregon's games and completed 64.1% of his passes for a Pac-12 Conference-leading 2,989 yards with 18 touchdown passes and seven interceptions and also rushed 151 times for 658 yards and nine touchdowns.

Professional career

Brown signed with the Baltimore Ravens as an undrafted free agent on May 6, 2022. He was waived on August 30, 2022 and signed to the practice squad the next day. He was elevated from the practice squad on December 11. On the same day, he made his first career appearance in relief of injured quarterback Tyler Huntley, completing 3 of 5 passes for 16 yards and helping the Ravens win 16–14. He was signed to the active roster on December 31. Brown would start in the Ravens Week 18 against the Cincinnati Bengals due to injuries to Lamar Jackson and Huntley. He threw for 286 yards, but also committed three turnovers as the Ravens lost 16–27.

NFL career statistics

References

External links
 Baltimore Ravens bio
 Boston College Eagles bio
 Oregon Ducks bio

1998 births
Living people
People from Aberdeen Township, New Jersey
Players of American football from New Jersey
Sportspeople from Monmouth County, New Jersey
St. John Vianney High School (New Jersey) alumni
American football quarterbacks
Boston College Eagles football players
Oregon Ducks football players
Baltimore Ravens players